Sonderhofen is a municipality  in the district of Würzburg in Bavaria, Germany.

References

Würzburg (district)